Paeth may refer to:

 Paeth filter, a filtering algorithm used in the compression of PNG images
 Alan W. Paeth (born 1956), Canadian computer scientist who developed the Paeth filter
 Sascha Paeth (born 1970), German musician